Dyskaryosis (dis-kār-ĭ-ó-sis) is abnormal cytologic changes of squamous epithelial cells characterized by hyperchromatic nuclei and/or irregular nuclear chromatin. This may be followed by the development of a malignant neoplasm. Dyskaryosis is used synonymously with dysplasia, which is the more common term. The term "dyskaryosis" is not to be confused with "dyskeratosis".

"Dyskaryosis" is a term used for all squamous mucosal surfaces and commonly used for the uterine cervix condition in which some of the epithelial cells near the external orifice show abnormalities in their cellular nuclei.

These changes are often quite subtle; often seen as temporary changes between the ages of fifteen and twenty-five. Apparent dyskaryosis below the age of twenty-five is not regarded as significant, and in many countries where cervical screening programmes exist, the age of entry into the programme is around that of 25 years old. The programme often terminates around the age of 65, assuming no abnormal smears were found previously over a ten-year period.

Cervical dyskaryosis is classified into three degrees of severity: mild dyskaryosis, moderate and severe. A further category is used to define cells that do not show significant nuclear abnormality, and may not be described as 'dyskaryotic.' This category is termed [epithelial] cellular "borderline changes". As dyskaryotic epithelium found in the cervix have malignant potential, most cases of dyskaryosis will typically be followed up and referred. The risk is increasingly high with higher grades of dyskaryosis. Most borderline changes will resolve spontaneously, as will many mild ones. Moderate and severe changes are usually treated, by electrocautery, cryocautery or loop excision, with the objective of completely removing the abnormal area.

Dyskaryosis can be caused through infection with human papilloma virus (HPV), which exists in a number of different strains; type 16 and type 18 cause dyskaryosis more frequently and readily than do other types. These viruses are nearly always sexually transmitted. Immunization, which is now available against HPV 16 and 18, will prevent further infection by these strains. But if infection has occurred before immunization, and cellular change has already occurred, the vaccine does not reduce the risk of developing dyskaryotic change.

Dyskaryosis means abnormal nucleus and refers to the abnormal epithelial cell which may be found in cervical sample. It is graded from low to high grade based on degree of abnormality.  All of these changes are treatable with no recurrence.

See also
 Cervical intraepithelial neoplasia

References

Papillomavirus-associated diseases
Histopathology